Eslamabad (also Romanized as Eslāmābād; also known as Gabrābād (Persian: گبراباد) and Gīrābād) is a village in Sudlaneh Rural District, in the Central District of Quchan County, Razavi Khorasan Province, Iran. At the 2006 census, its population was 604, in 122 families.

References 

Populated places in Quchan County